Oldmans Creek is a  tributary of the Delaware River in southwestern New Jersey in the United States.

Oldmans Creek defines part of the western boundary between Gloucester and Salem counties.  It starts just southwest of Glassboro, approximately one mile from the head of Raccoon Creek.  It finishes in the lower Delaware River approximately four miles upstream from Penns Grove.

See also
List of rivers of New Jersey

References

Tributaries of the Delaware River
Rivers of Gloucester County, New Jersey
Rivers of New Jersey
Rivers of Salem County, New Jersey